Live in Glasgow is a live DVD released by New Order, in 2008. It features 18 tracks, recorded in October 2006 at the O2 Academy Glasgow. A second disc is also included which features tracks recorded live from the early days called Rare and Unseen Footage.

Limited editions released by HMV (UK) included a bonus CD that compiles 12 songs from the Glasgow performance.

Track listing

DVD one - Live in Glasgow
 "Crystal"
 "Turn"
 "True Faith"
 "Regret"
 "Ceremony"
 "Who's Joe"
 "These Days"
 "Krafty"
 "Waiting for the Sirens' Call"
 "Your Silent Face"
 "Guilt Is a Useless Emotion"
 "Bizarre Love Triangle"
 "Temptation"
 "Perfect Kiss"
 "Blue Monday"
 "Transmission"
 "Shadowplay"
 "Love Will Tear Us Apart"

DVD two - Rare and Unseen Footage
Celebration 1981
 "Ceremony"
 "I.C.B."
 "Chosen Time"

Glastonbury 1981
  "Senses"
 "Procession"
 "The Him"

Rome 1982
  "Ultraviolence"
 "Hurt"

Cork 1983
  "Leave Me Alone"
 "Everything's Gone Green"

Rotterdam 1985
  "Sunrise"
 "As It Is When It Was"
 "The Village"
 "This Time of Night"

Toronto 1985
  "We All Stand"
 "Age of Consent"
 "Temptation"

Shoreline 1989
  "Dream Attack"
 "1963"

Hyde Park Wireless 2005
  "Run Wild"
 "She's Lost Control"

References

2008 live albums
2008 video albums
Live video albums
New Order (band) video albums
New Order (band) live albums